Bitz & Bob is a children's animated television series that originally aired on CBeebies.

Premise 
Bitz, a problem solving girl, and her younger brother, Bob, love to make stuff, imagine extraordinary adventures and engineering. They explore and learn their love of STEAM, (Science, Technology, Engineering, Arts, and Mathematics) to invent their ways to save the day in the technological city called Craft City.

Characters 
Bitz (voiced by Dolly Heavey) is an older girl who solves problems, builds, and fixes. She has a younger brother, Bob. Her catchphrase is: “Time for a Bitz brain blitz!”

Bob (voiced by Duke Davis) is Bitz's younger brother. He is dressed as a robot/dinosaur made out of cardboard. He helps out Bitz to solve problems. His catchphrase is: “Bitz blitzed it!” and “Awesome!”

Purl (voiced by Maria Darling) is a soft ragdoll (she wears rollerskates on some episode) and Bitz's bestie. She is a perfectionist, and loves adding a touch of glitter on every project. Her catchphrase is “Oh my shiny sequins!”

Bevel (voiced by Rob Delaney) is a cool monster-like action figure and power tool. and is Bob's favorite toy. He is an ultimate action guy with a sensitive side, but not truly clever or brave. He speaks with an American accent, his catchphrase is “BOO-YAH!” which he says in every occasion.

Zip and Pop (voiced by Marc Silk and Maria Darling respectively) are two slapstick-loving, practical joking brother and sister zip up cloth dolls. They can carry tools and mechanical stuff. In a clumsy, curious and comical double act, they find pretty much everything hilarious. Impulsive and impetuous, they do not like being alone, sitting still or being unzipped.

Production 
BBC and FremantleMedia produced the series along with Jellyfish Pictures.

After Boat Rocker Media acquired FremantleMedia’s Kids and Family Division, they started producing it.

Broadcast 
The series aired on TVOKids and Knowledge Kids in Canada, EBS in South Korea, SVT in Sweden, NRK in Norway, YLE in Finland, Hop! Channel in Israel, KiKa in Germany, Nat Geo Kids in Latin America and Brazil, Kiwi TV in Hungary, Minimax in Czech, TVP ABC in Poland, BNT 2 in Bulgaria, France 5 in France, and GOOD TV in Taiwan. In Scotland, it was shown in BBC Alba and translated in Scot Gaelic as Bitz agus Bob (similar to predecessor back in 2001).

You Can Do it Too!
You Can Do it Too! is a short that is shown in the end of the episode. It is about the projects from the show for the viewers to try them at home.

References 

2010s British animated television series
2020s British animated television series
2018 British television series debuts
2010s Canadian animated television series
2020s Canadian animated television series
2018 Canadian television series debuts
British children's animated adventure television series
Canadian children's animated adventure television series
British preschool education television series
Canadian preschool education television series
Animated preschool education television series
2010s preschool education television series
CBeebies
Television series by Boat Rocker Media
Television series by FremantleMedia Kids & Family
British computer-animated television series
Canadian computer-animated television series
Animated television series about children
English-language television shows